Gabbidon is a surname. Notable people with the surname include:

Basil Gabbidon (born 1955), British Jamaican guitarist and singer
Danny Gabbidon (born 1979), British footballer
Shaun L. Gabbidon (born 1967), British criminologist and author
Sian Gabbidon (born 1992), British businesswoman, fashion designer, and media personality